Stanislav Valeryevich Emelyanov (born 23 October 1990) is a former Russian race walker.

Doping

Bio passport ban
IAAF announced 28 July 2014 that Emelyanov was sanctioned for doping after his biological passport had showed anomalies. His ban ended 14 December 2014. Emelyanov was the 17th athlete trained by Viktor Chegin to be banned for doping.

EPO positive
In September 2015 IAAF confirmed that Emelyanov was provisionally suspended after a sample from an out-of-competition control in Saransk in June had been found positive for a prohibited substance. Emelyanov had the previous day given interviews saying his B sample had been found negative, and that the substance in question was EPO.

Emelyanov was given an 8-year ban for second doping offence, commencing on 7 April 2017 and has been stripped of all results obtained after 2 June 2015. This ban was extended indefinitely in March 2018.

International competitions

References

1990 births
Living people
People from Saransk
Sportspeople from Mordovia
Russian male racewalkers
World Athletics U20 Championships winners
World Youth Championships in Athletics winners
Russian Athletics Championships winners
European Athletics Championships medalists
Doping cases in athletics
Russian sportspeople in doping cases